Elysium Mons  is a volcano on Mars located in the volcanic province Elysium, at , in the Martian eastern hemisphere. It is flanked by the smaller volcanoes Hecates Tholus to the northeast, and Albor Tholus to the southeast.

Discovery
Elysium Mons was discovered in 1972 in images returned by the Mariner 9 orbiter.

Terrestrial analog
The terrestrial volcano Emi Koussi (in Chad) has been studied as an analog of Elysium Mons. The two shield volcanoes have summit calderas of similar size, but Elysium Mons is 3.5 times larger in diameter and 6 times higher than its counterpart on Earth.

Possible source of nakhlites
A 6.5 km diameter crater at 29.674 N, 130.799 E, in the volcanic plains to the northwest of Elysium Mons has been identified as a possible source for the nakhlite meteorites, a family of similar basaltic Martian meteorites with cosmogenic ages of about 10.7 Ma, suggesting ejection from Mars by a single impact event. The dates of the igneous rocks of the nakhlites range from 1416 ± 7 Ma to 1322 ± 10 Ma. These dates plus the crater dimensions suggest a growth rate of the source volcano during that interval of 0.4–0.7 m per Ma, far slower than would be expected for a terrestrial volcano. This implies that Martian volcanism had slowed greatly by that point in history.

Gallery

Interactive Mars map

See also
Geography of Mars
List of mountains on Mars by height
List of tallest mountains in the Solar System

References

External links

 Google Mars - zoomable map centered on Elysium Mons
 "Elysium Mons Volcano" - NASA images of Elysium Mons, from Malin Space Science Systems

Volcanoes of Mars
Mountains on Mars
Elysium quadrangle